Rõuge Parish is a rural municipality of Estonia, in Võru County. In 2019, it had a population of 5,427 and an area of 933 km².

In 2017, it merged with Haanja Parish, Mõniste Parish, Misso Parish, and Varstu Parish to create a new entity. It retained the Rõuge Parish name.

Settlements
Small boroughs
Misso - Rõuge - Varstu

Villages
Aabra - Ahitsa - Ala-Palo - Ala-Suhka - Ala-Tilga - Andsumäe - Augli - Haabsilla - Haanja - Häärmäni - Haavistu - Haki - Hallimäe - Hämkoti - Handimiku - Hanija - Hansi - Hapsu - Härämäe - Harjuküla - Heedu - Heibri - Hinsa - Hino - Hintsiko - Hinu - Holdi - Horoski - Horosuu - Horsa - Hotõmäe - Hulaku - Hurda - Hürova - Hürsi - Hüti - Ihatsi - Jaanimäe - Jaanipeebu - Järvekülä - Järvepalu - Jugu - Käänu - Kääraku - Kaaratautsa - Käbli - Kadõni - Kähri - Kahrila-Mustahamba - Kahru - Kaku - Kaldemäe - Kallaste - Kaloga - Kaluka - Kängsepä - Kangsti - Karaski - Karba - Kärinä - Karisöödi - Kaubi - Kaugu - Kavõldi - Kellämäe - Kergatsi - Kiidi - Kilomani - Kimalase - Kimalasõ - Kirbu - Kiviora - Kivioru - Koemetsa - Kogrõ - Kokõ - Kokõjüri - Kokõmäe - Kolga - Kõomäe - Koorla - Kõrgepalu - Korgõssaarõ - Kossa - Kotka - Krabi - Kriguli - Kuiandi - Kuklase - Kuklasõ - Külma - Kundsa - Kurgjärve - Kurõ - Kurvitsa - Kuuda - Kuura - Kuutsi - Laisi - Laitsna-Hurda - Laossaarõ - Lauri - Laurimäe - Leimani - Leoski - Liguri - Liivakupalu - Lillimõisa  - Listaku - Loogamäe - Lükkä - Lutika - Lüütsepa - Luutsniku - Mäe-Lüütsepä - Mäe-Palo - Mäe-Suhka - Mäe-Tilga - Mahtja - Mallika - Märdi - Märdimiku - Matsi - Mauri - Meelaku - Metstaga - Miilimäe - Mikita - Missokülä - Misso-Saika - Möldre - Möldri - Mõniste - Mõõlu - Muduri - Muhkamõtsa - Muna - Naapka - Nilbõ - Muraski - Murati - Murdõmäe - Mustahamba - Mutemetsa -  Naapka - Nilbõ - Nogu - Nursi - Ortumäe - Paaburissa - Paeboja - Paganamaa - Pähni - Pältre - Palujüri - Palanumäe - Palli - Palujüri - Pärlijõe - Parmu - Parmupalu - Pausakunnu - Pedejä - Peebu - Peedo - Petrakuudi - Piipsemäe - Pillardi - Plaani - Plaksi - Põdra - Põdramõtsa - Põnni - Põru - Posti - Preeksa - Pressi - Pugõstu - Pulli - Pundi - Punsa - Pupli - Purka - Puspuri - Püssä - Raagi - Rammuka - Rasva - Raudsepa - Raudsepä - Rebäse - Rebäsemõisa - Resto - Riitsilla - Ristemäe - Ritsiko - Rogosi-Mikita - Roobi - Rõuge-Matsi - Rusa - Ruuksu - Ruusmäe - Saagri - Saagrimäe - Saarlasõ - Sadramõtsa - Saika - Saki - Sakudi - Sakurgi - Saluora - Sandi - Sandisuu - Sänna - Sapi - Sarise - Saru - Savimäe - Savioja - Savioru - Sika - Sikalaanõ - Siksälä - Simmuli - Simula - Singa - Soekõrdsi - Soemõisa - Soodi - Söödi - Soolätte - Soomõoru - Sormuli - Suurõ-Ruuga - Suurõsuu - Tagakolga - Tallima - Taudsa - Tialasõ - Tiidu - Tiitsa - Tika - Tilgu - Tindi - Toodsi - Tõnkova - Trolla - Tsiamäe - Tsiiruli - Tsiistre - Tsilgutaja - Tsirgupalu - Tsolli - Tsutsu - Tummelka - Tundu - Tursa - Tuuka - Tüütsi - Udsali - Utessuu - Uue-Saaluse - Vaalimäe - Vaarkali - Vadsa - Väiko-Tiilige - Väiku-Ruuga - Vakari - Vanamõisa - Vana-Roosa - Vänni - Vastsekivi - Vastse-Roosa - Vihkla - Viitina - Viliksaarõ - Villa - Villike - Viru - Vodi - Vorstimäe - Vungi

Religion

Gallery

See also
Nursipalu training area

References

This article includes content from the Estonian Wikipedia article Rõuge vald.

External links